September 2017

See also

References 

 09
September 2017 events in the United States